St George's Cross subway station is a Glasgow Subway station in Glasgow, Scotland which serves the areas of Woodside and Woodlands of the city. It is located at St George's Cross, previously an important road junction but realigned due to the construction of the M8 motorway and less heavily used by traffic since then.

The station was opened in 1896 and comprehensively modernised in 1977–1980. It still retains its original island platform configuration, though surface buildings were rebuilt prior to the 1977-1980 modernisation scheme, as part of a new road project.

This station recorded 580,000 boardings in the twelve months ending on 31 March 2005.

St George's Cross is one of the stations mentioned in Cliff Hanley's song "The Glasgow Underground".

Past passenger numbers 
 2011/12: 0.544 million annually

Notes and references

Glasgow Subway stations
Railway stations in Great Britain opened in 1896
1896 establishments in Scotland